William Norman "Tiny" Sailes (25 June 1920 – 27 December 2012) was a Fleet Air Arm pilot of the Second World War who was awarded the Distinguished Service Cross for his part in the attack on the German U-boat base at Kilbotn in Norway on 4 May 1945. The attack was the last British air raid of the war.

References 

1920 births
2012 deaths
Royal Navy officers of World War II
Recipients of the Distinguished Service Cross (United Kingdom)
People from Ellesmere Port
Royal Navy officers
Military personnel from Cheshire